Calcium/calmodulin-dependent protein kinase type II beta chain is an enzyme that in humans is encoded by the CAMK2B gene.

Function 

The enzyme belongs to the serine/threonine protein kinase family and to the Ca2+/calmodulin-dependent protein kinase subfamily. Calcium signalling is crucial for several aspects of plasticity at glutamatergic synapses. In mammalian cells, the enzyme is composed of four different chains: alpha, beta, gamma, and delta. The product of this gene is a beta chain. It is possible that distinct isoforms of this chain have different cellular localizations and interact differently with calmodulin. Eight transcript variants encoding eight distinct isoforms have been identified for this gene.

Interactions 

CAMK2B has been shown to interact with Actinin alpha 4.

References

Further reading

External links
 

EC 2.7.11